In non-technical terms, M-theory presents an idea about the basic substance of the universe. As of 2022, science has produced no experimental evidence to support the conclusion that M-theory is a description of the real world. Although a complete mathematical formulation of M-theory is not known, the general approach is the leading contender for a universal "Theory of Everything" that unifies gravity with other forces such as electromagnetism. M-theory aims to unify quantum mechanics with general relativity's gravitational force in a mathematically consistent way. In comparison, other theories such as loop quantum gravity are considered by physicists and researchers/students to be less elegant, because they posit gravity to be completely different from forces such as the electromagnetic force.

Background
In the early years of the 20th century, the atom – long believed to be the smallest building-block of matter – was proven to consist of even smaller components called protons, neutrons and electrons, which are known as subatomic particles. Other subatomic particles began being discovered in the 1960s. In the 1970s, it was discovered that protons and neutrons (and other hadrons) are themselves made up of smaller particles called quarks. The Standard Model is the set of rules that describes the interactions of these particles.

In the 1980s, a new mathematical model of theoretical physics, called string theory, emerged. It showed how all the different subatomic particles known to science could be constructed by hypothetical one-dimensional "strings", infinitesimal building-blocks that have only the dimension of length, but not height or width.

However, for string theory to be mathematically consistent, the strings must be in a universe of ten dimensions. This contradicts the experience that our real universe has four dimensions: three space dimensions (height, width, and length) and one time dimension. To "save" their theory, string theorists therefore added the explanation that the additional six dimensions exist but cannot be detected directly; this was explained by sophisticated mathematical objects called Calabi–Yau manifolds. The number of dimensions was later increased to 11 based on various interpretations of the 10-dimensional theory that led to five partial theories, as described below. Supergravity theory also played a significant part in establishing the necessity of the 11th dimension.

These "strings" vibrate in multiple dimensions and, depending on how they vibrate, they might be seen in three-dimensional space as matter, light or gravity. It is the vibration of the string that determines whether it appears to be matter or energy, and every form of matter or energy is the result of the vibration of strings.

String theory as described above ran into a problem: another version of the equations was discovered, then another, and then another. Eventually, five major string theories were developed. The main differences between the theories were principally the number of dimensions in which the strings developed, and their characteristics (some were open loops, some were closed loops, etc.). Furthermore, all these theories appeared to be workable. Scientists were not comfortable with five seemingly contradictory sets of equations to describe the same thing.

Speaking at the string theory conference at the University of Southern California in 1995, Edward Witten of the Institute for Advanced Study suggested that the five different versions of string theory might be describing the same thing seen from different perspectives. He proposed a unifying theory called "M-theory", in which the "M" is not specifically defined but is generally understood to stand for "membrane". The words "matrix", "master", "mother", "monster", "mystery" and "magic" have also been claimed. M-theory brought all of the string theories together. It did this by asserting that strings are really one-dimensional slices of a two-dimensional membrane vibrating in 11-dimensional spacetime. Vibrations of higher-dimensional objects (as in three-dimensional vibrating blob or sphere or even more possible dimensions) are certainly a part of M-theory, but the basic theory of branes is still in progress. Higher-dimensional objects are much harder to mathematically calculate than a point in classical physics or a one-dimension string in string theory or two-dimensional membranes in M-theory.

Status
M-theory is not complete, but the mathematics of the approach has been explored in great detail. However, so far no experimental support for the M-theory exists. Some physicists are skeptical that this approach will ever lead to a physical theory describing our real world, due to fundamental issues.

Nevertheless, some cosmologists are drawn to M-theory because of its mathematical elegance and relative simplicity, triggering the hope that the simplicity is a reason why it may describe our world.

One feature of M-theory that has drawn great interest is that it naturally predicts the existence of the graviton, a spin-2 particle hypothesized to mediate the gravitational force. Furthermore, M-theory naturally predicts a phenomenon that resembles black hole evaporation. Competing unification theories such as asymptotically safe gravity, E8 theory, noncommutative geometry, and causal fermion systems have not demonstrated any level of mathematical consistency. Another approach to quantum gravity is loop quantum gravity, a non-unifying theory; many physicists consider loop quantum gravity to be less elegant than M-theory because it posits gravity to be completely different from the other fundamental forces.

See also
 History of string theory

References

Further reading

External links

 The Elegant Universe – A three-hour miniseries with Brian Greene by NOVA (original PBS Broadcast Dates: October 28 and November 4, 2003). Various images, texts, videos and animations explaining string theory and M-theory.

Philosophy of science
Physical cosmology
String theory